S. nanus may refer to:
 Somatogyrus nanus, the dwarf pebblesnail, a freshwater snail species
 Sorex nanus, the dwarf shrew, a mammal species endemic to the United States
 Spizaetus nanus, the Wallace's hawk-eagle, a bird of prey species

See also
 Nanus (disambiguation)